W la foca is a 1982 commedia sexy all'italiana directed by Nando Cicero.

Plot
Andrea (Lory Del Santo) is a young and naïve nurse from Veneto who is employed by the Roman physician Dr. Filippo Patacchiola (Bombolo). Patacchiola lives with his nymphomaniac wife (Dagmar Lassander), raunchy daughter Marisa (Michela Miti), senile father (Riccardo Billi), mentally retarded son Paolo (Fabio Grossi), and African maid Domenica (Anna Fall) who Patacchiola wants to use as a "manmaker" for his son. The inevitable cycle of misunderstandings, couple exchange, and sexual seductions gets even more complicated when Andrea's lover Michele (Carlo Marini) arrives in Rome to see Andrea.

Cast
Lory Del Santo: Andrea
Michela Miti: Marisa Patacchiola	
Riccardo Billi: the Grandfather
Bombolo: Dr. Filippo Patacchiola
Dagmar Lassander: Signora Patacchiola
Fabio Grossi: Paolo Patacchiola
Anna Fall: Domenica
Carlo Marini: Michele
Victor Cavallo: painter	
Franco Bracardi: tramp 
Enzo Andronico: exhibitionist	 
Moana Pozzi: girl on the train

Screening
In 2004 it was restored and shown as part of the retrospective "Storia Segreta del Cinema Italiano: Italian Kings of the Bs" at the 61st Venice International Film Festival.

See also       
 List of Italian films of 1982

References

External links

1982 films
1980s sex comedy films
Films directed by Nando Cicero
Films scored by Detto Mariano
Commedia sexy all'italiana
Films set in Rome
Films shot in Rome
1982 comedy films
1980s Italian films